Lulzim Tafa (born 2 February 1970 in Lipjan, Kosovo) is a Kosovan educator, professor and poet. He serves as Rector of AAB University,

Early life
Tafa was born in Lipjan near Prishtina, the capital city of the Republic of Kosova.

He completed his primary and secondary education in Lipjan. He graduated from the Faculty of Law of the University of Prishtina. He completed his doctoral studies at the Law Faculty of the University of Sarajevo to obtain the title Doctor of Legal Sciences.

Career

Academic 
Tafa served as a full-time and visiting professor of criminal law in regional universities.

He concentrates on human and animal rights. Lulzim tafa carroon.jpg

Tafa held positions in the academic hierarchy, including executive academic positions in research centers and university departments. He served as a member of editorial boards of scientific journals and a board member of organizations in the fields of law, criminology, human rights, animal protection.

He serves as the Rector of AAB University, the largest non-public university in the Western Balkan region.

He founded AAB University's Human Rights Protection Center, as well as the Cultural Center and the Faruk Begolli Professional Theater. He established five international awards, including the international award for arts and literature "Ali Podrimja".

Tafa is committed to educating students with special needs and minorities. In 2012, Euromenager magazine and the European Management Union elected him as the Manager of the Year in the field of education.

He published books and monographs in the field of law. He is a columnist for various national and international newspapers, magazines and information portals.

Poet 
As a poet, Lulzim Tafa belongs to the generation of poets of the nineties, when wars broke out as following the dissolution of the former Yugoslavia. He started writing poetry as a primary school student. His first poems were published in school literary magazines. His first book of poetry was published while a university student. During the 1999 war in Kosovo, he was in Kosovo when all of his possessions were burnt down with his family house, including his library, his pictures and memories, and most notably over 300 poems in manuscript.

After the war he carried on writing poetry, working for human rights and freedom, and promoting peace and freedom for everyone.

His primary and vital occupation is literature. He is the author of books and collections of poems, prose and literary criticism. His poems are translated into several languages, including English, German, Italian, Serbian, Croatian, Montenegrin, Bosnian, Romanian, French, Arabic, Greek, Turkish and Swedish. They are included in anthologies. International publishers translated and published his books.

He is one of Albania's most famous poets and the most translated. He is a member of the European Academy of Sciences and Arts.

Recognition 

 Kosovo Presidential Medal of Merit (2018) Kosovo
 International Prize "Mihai Eminescu" (2018) Romania
 International Prize "Neruda Awars" (2019) Italy
 International Prize "Naji Namad" (2019) Lebanon
 International Prize "Radovan Zogovic" 2016, Montenegro

International Prizes
Lulzim Tafa is the loreat of international prizes. He received these prizes in a different countries and here are jus some of them. He is one of the most know poets from Kosovo and the critics consider him a poet in the real meaning.

Published books
Mihai eminescu.jpg Çmimi i meritave.jpg Neruda awards.jpg 
 Gjaku nuk bëhet ujë- collection of poems, Rilindja, Pristina 1993
 Metaforë e pikëlluar- collection of poems, Rilindja, Pristina 1995
 Planeti Babiloni- dramatized poem, Rilindja, Prishtina 1997
 Vdekja çon fjalë- collection of poems, Pristina, 1998
 Analogjia e Shëmtisë collection of poems, Faik Konica, Prishtina, 2002
 I Still Have Two Words Faik Konica Press, Prishtina, 2011 
 Shtini n’dhe këto fjalë- collection of poems, Faik Konica, Prishtina 2015 
 Traumausstellung Poetry, Amanda Verlag, Sinaia 2013  
 Terrible songs Gracious light, New York, 2013  
 Under manen sover tiderna Poetry, Erik Hans Forlag, 2012
 Expozitie de vise Poetry, Amanda Edit, 2012  
 La theorie de l’explication des reves, Poetry, Esprit Des Eagles, 2013    
 Vraziji Posao Poetry, Djordan Studio, 2015  
 La cronica di una santa Guerra Poetry, Ginta Latina, 2013   
 Zavjetne pjesme Poetry, Dignitas, Podgorica, 2016  
 Paketimi i merzisë Poetry book, Luma Grafik, Tetovo 2017
 Teuta Poezi, Grinta, 2018  
 Dali ti imas Bolka Poetry book, Akademski Pecat, 2018   
 Ne zovi me Nedeljom poetry book, Allma, Blegrade 2018 
 Flirt poetry, Botimet AAB, Pristina 2019 
 Të Dielave mos më thirr më, poetry Armagedoni, Pristina 2019 
 Szokatlan ima, poetry in Hungarian Budapest 2019 
 Ne Klici me v nedeljo, poetry in Slovenian, Lubljana 2020

References

1970 births
Living people
University of Pristina alumni
University of Sarajevo alumni
Date of birth missing (living people)